Geoffrey Alfred Hickinbottom (born 15 November 1932) is a former English cricketer.  Hickinbottom was a right-handed batsman who fielded as a wicket-keeper.  He was born at Leicester, Leicestershire.

Hickinbottom made his first-class debut for Leicestershire against Yorkshire in the 1959 County Championship.  He made four further first-class appearances for the county in that season, the last of which came against Glamorgan.  A specialist wicket-keeper, he took four catches and made three stumpings behind the stumps, while with the bat he scored six runs.

References

External links
Geoffrey Hickinbottom at ESPNcricinfo
Geoffrey Hickinbottom at CricketArchive 

1932 births
Living people
Cricketers from Leicester
English cricketers
Leicestershire cricketers
Wicket-keepers